Myron Stevens (February 17, 1901 Los Angeles, California – July 2, 1988 Sun City West, Arizona) was an American racecar driver, but achieved more fame as a racecar builder. Stevens started working for Harry A. Miller in 1922, building bodies, frames and fuel tanks for Miller race cars. In 1927, Frank S. Lockhart, the winner of the 1926 Indianapolis 500, hired Stevens to help create the body for Lockhart's Stutz Black Hawk land speed record car.

After Lockhart was killed in that car while attempting a land speed record in 1928, Stevens established his own shop and continued building racecar bodies.  In 1930, the second through sixth place finishers at the Indianapolis 500 all had Stevens chassis. He built cars for Indy stars such as Louis Meyer, Wilbur Shaw, Peter DePaolo, Chet Gardner, Rex Mays and others. In 1955, one of his cars took pole position at Indy

Career awards

He was inducted in the National Sprint Car Hall of Fame in 1993.
Indianapolis Motor Speedway Hall of Fame inducted Stevens into its ranks in 1993.

Indy 500 results

References

1901 births
1988 deaths
American racing drivers
Indianapolis 500 drivers
National Sprint Car Hall of Fame inductees
Racing drivers from Los Angeles